Cheadle railway station served the English town of Cheadle, Staffordshire. It was the terminus of a branch line from Cresswell and opened in 1901.

Facilities
The initial station buildings were of a temporary nature and a permanent structure was built in 1910. Later that year, the goods yard was expanded and the goods shed was extended. A new loading dock was also built and a crane was later provided. Cheadle station had a loop but no turntable and so most trains left Cheadle with the locomotive running "bunker first".

Later years
Passenger services were withdrawn in June 1963, though the closure of the service was not directly due to the Beeching Axe (withdrawal had already been proposed prior to the publication of his report in March of that year). Local sand traffic from nearby quarries continued and a new road-rail loading dock replaced the goods shed in the late 1960s. Approximately 1,200 tons per day was being moved by this time but in the 1970s the amount of traffic reduced and on 6 March 1978 public freight working was withdrawn. A small amount of traffic for railway civil engineering use continued until November 3, 1984.

An InterCity charter train ran from Euston to Cheadle in 1985, InterCity choosing the Cheadle branch to show the versatility of their charter service. Passengers were taken to Alton Towers by coach from Cheadle, which fueled debate about a regular service, however this came to nothing

Cheadle station building  was demolished in 1986, leaving just a bare platform at the end of the branch line that quickly became overgrown with weeds.

The site today

The only trace of the station that remains today is the station master's  house; the station platform was demolished in 1994, and the sand loading dock and a buffer stop that was left behind by the track lifters in 1992 were also crushed to make way for a new housing development.

References

Further reading

Buildings and structures demolished in 1994
Disused railway stations in Staffordshire
Railway stations in Great Britain closed in 1963
Railway stations in Great Britain opened in 1901
Former North Staffordshire Railway stations
Cheadle, Staffordshire